Senator Bloomer may refer to:

Asa S. Bloomer (1891–1963), Vermont State Senate
John H. Bloomer (1930–1995), Vermont State Senate
Robert A. Bloomer (1921–1999), Vermont State Senate